The Merrimack Warriors are the intercollegiate athletic teams that represent Merrimack College, located in North Andover, Massachusetts, in NCAA sporting competitions. All of the Warrior athletic teams compete at the Division I level. Men's and women's ice hockey compete in the Hockey East conference, and men's lacrosse competes in the America East Conference, while the remaining teams are members of the Northeast Conference.

The college's combination of academic and athletic success has garnered Merrimack the #4 ranking in the country among NCAA Division II schools in the Top 100 Collegiate Power Rankings that are published by the National College Scouting Association. In addition, Merrimack finished 96th in the overall NCSA Power Rankings across all three NCAA divisions.

During the 2019–20 season Merrimack began their four-year transition to Division I and will be full Division I members by 2023–24.

History
Highlights of Merrimack athletic history includes three national championships: the 1978 men's hockey team Division II Men's Ice Hockey Championship; the 1994 women's softball team won Division II Women's College World Series and Men's Lacrosse won the 2018 National Title. In 2006, Merrimack football became Northeast 10 co-champions and received their first NCAA Division II playoff bid to go on to win their first NCAA playoff game. In 2012, Merrimack Men's Tennis became Northeast 10 Champions, led by Senior captains Max Eppley and Sean Pahler, and first year head coach Sean Tully. This was Merrimack's first ever Men's Tennis Championship.

Varsity teams

Football

Merrimack has made one appearance in the NCAA Division II football playoffs; their record is 1–1.

Conferences
1985–1995: Independent
1996: Eastern Collegiate Football Conference
1997–2000: Eastern Football Conference
2001–2018: Northeast-10 Conference
2019–present: Northeast Conference

Soccer

Merrimack College men's soccer team made school history in 2012 with the programs first ever NCAA Division II National Tournament berth.  After finishing in first place in the Northeast 10 regular season, the men's soccer team went on to win the first round of the tournament against rivals Franklin Pierce University, but were knocked out the following round by Northeast 10 rivals Southern New Hampshire University.  The 2012 men's soccer team was led by Head Coach Anthony Martone and assistant coaches Derek Valego, Michael Allen, Eric Ernst, and Sam Nunes.  The team was led on the field by captains Alejandro Fuchs of Caracas, Venezuela and Nelson da Graca of Gothenburg, Sweden.

NCAA championships

National championships
Men's ice hockey: 1978
Softball: 1994
Men's lacrosse: 2018, 2019

Regional championships
Women's basketball: 2004, 2005
Women's soccer: 1996

Appearances
Baseball: 1995, 1996, 2018
Men's basketball: 1977, 1978, 1991, 1992, 2000, 2008, 2009, 2010
Women's basketball: 2003, 2004, 2005
Football: 2006
Men's ice hockey:
Division II: 1978, 1980, 1982, 1984
Division I: 1988, 2011
Men's lacrosse: 2009, 2015, 2016, 2017, 2018, 2019

Women's soccer: 1996, 1999, 2001, 2002, 2003, 2004, 2005, 2007, 2008, 2009, 2011
Softball: 1991, 1992, 1993, 1994, 1995, 1996, 1997, 1998, 1999, 2000, 2001, 2002, 2004, 2011
Men's tennis: 2008, 2009, 2010, 2011, 2012, 2013, 2014, 2015, 2016
Women's tennis: 2009
Women's volleyball: 2007, 2008

Conference championships

Northeast
Men's Basketball: 2020
Men's Soccer: 2019

Northeast-10
Baseball: 1990, 1995, 1996, 2018
Men's Basketball: 2000
Women's Basketball: 2004
Women's Cross Country: 1997, 1998, 1999 
Men's Lacrosse: 2000, 2010, 2018
Men's Soccer: 1995, 1996, 1997, 2017
Women's Soccer: 1986, 1987, 1988, 1989, 1990, 1993, 1995, 1996, 1999
Softball: 1991, 1992, 1993, 1994, 1995, 1999, 2001, 2002
Men's Tennis: 2012, 2013, 2015

ECAC
Hockey: 1967, 1968, 1977, 1980, 1987, 1988, 1989
Men's Soccer: 1997
Women's Soccer: 1988, 2000

References

External links